Suseni (literally 'Upperbourg') is a commune in Mureș County, Transylvania, Romania that is composed of two villages, Luieriu and Suseni. It has a population of 2,319: 62% Romanians, 29% Hungarians and 9% Roma.

See also
List of Hungarian exonyms (Mureș County)

References

Communes in Mureș County
Localities in Transylvania